John Henry Levett (8 August 1927 – 14 March 2008) was a British philatelist who was added to the Roll of Distinguished Philatelists in 1979. He was a president of the Royal Philatelic Society London.

References

Signatories to the Roll of Distinguished Philatelists
1927 births
2008 deaths
British philatelists
Fellows of the Royal Philatelic Society London
Presidents of the Royal Philatelic Society London